Jaźwiny  (Yazvyny) is a village in the administrative district of Gmina Biała Podlaska, within Biała Podlaska County, Lublin Voivodeship, in eastern Poland.

References

Villages in Biała Podlaska County